Morten Stræde (born 1956) is a Danish sculptor. He attended the Royal Danish Academy of Fine Arts from 1978 to 1985 and later became a professor there (1994–2002). Morten Stræde had his breakthrough in the 1980s; in his art he uses both organic as well as geometric styles. In 2011, he created three new urban spaces in the Nørrebro borough in Copenhagen.

Stræde was awarded the Premio Internazionale di scultura in 1999 and received the Eckersberg Medal in 2000. He has also received the Thorvaldsen Medal. In its appraisal of Stræde's work, the academy noted his ability to assess the history of the place and the physical location where his public art is to be displayed. An example mentioned by the jury is Ulisse which Stræde produced for the University of Aarhus.

Representation 
Stræde is represented at the following art museums:

 National Gallery of Denmark
 Kobberstiksamlingen 
 ARoS Aarhus Kunstmuseum
 Herning Museum of Art 
 Horsens Museum of Art 
 Kunstmuseet Køge Skitsesamling 
 Vestsjællands Museum of Art 
 Kunstmuseet Trapholt 
 Esbjerg Art Museum 
 Vejle Museum of Art 
 Gothenburg Museum of Art

References

External links 
 straede.net, official site

1956 births
Danish sculptors
Danish male artists
Living people
Recipients of the Thorvaldsen Medal
Recipients of the Eckersberg Medal
Male sculptors